TopologiLinux is a free Linux distribution to be run on an existing Microsoft Windows system. The main feature of TopologiLinux is that it does not require any partitioning. It is based on Slackware and Cooperative Linux (coLinux). TopologiLinux has been chosen as one of nine open-source projects used as principal examples in a study of the characteristics of open-source software (Gacek and Budi 2004).

Usage
TopologiLinux creates one hard disk image and other related files in a directory "/tlinux*" (where * represents the version number of TopologiLinux) on a chosen drive using Windows. TopologiLinux cannot be set up through DOS. The user may boot the system through coLinux on Windows or directly on the computer by booting with the TopologiLinux disc.

Storage system
TopologiLinux creates a hard disk image file on an NTFS or FAT partition.

Usage on Windows
TopologiLinux uses coLinux to run on Windows; because of the cooperative design of coLinux, it is possible to work on Windows and Linux side by side.

See also
 Wubi (installer)
 Paravirtualization
 Comparison of platform virtualization software

References
 Gacek, Cristina; Arief, Budi. The many meanings of open source. IEEE Software. 2004 Jan/Feb;21(1):34-40.
 Sharma, Rakesh. Running Linux over Windows without virtualization: TopologiLinux allows you to integrate Linux and Windows on the same system without creating separate partitioning on your hard disk. PCQuest [serial on the Internet]. 7 May 2008 [cited 2008 Aug 27]. Available from: https://web.archive.org/web/20080828000009/http://pcquest.ciol.com/content/handson/2008/108050701.asp.

External links
 TopologiLinux Main Website
 
 
 , another Ubuntu-based coLinux distribution

Slackware
Linux distributions